Michael Joseph Kochel (March 6, 1916 – September 18, 1994) was a professional American football guard in the National Football League. He played one season for the Chicago Cardinals (1939).

One of the Seven Blocks of Granite for the Fordham Rams football team, Kochel was inducted into the school's hall of fame in 1975.

References

1916 births
1994 deaths
Bloomfield High School (New Jersey) alumni
People from Bloomfield, New Jersey
Players of American football from New Jersey
Sportspeople from Essex County, New Jersey
American football guards
Fordham Rams football players
Chicago Cardinals players